The Mark of the Wolfman,  is a 1968 Spanish horror film, the first in a long series of films about the werewolf Count Waldemar Daninsky, played by Paul Naschy. The film was also known as Hell's Creatures, The Nights of Satan, The Vampires of Dr. Dracula and Frankenstein's Bloody Terror (the latter despite the fact that the film has nothing to do with either Frankenstein or his "bloody terror"). Naschy originally suggested actress Barbara Steele for the part of the vampire countess Wandesa, but Aurora De Alba wound up getting the part.

The film was in production from February to March 1968. It was first released theatrically in Spain (on July 29, 1968), in West Germany (on February 7, 1969), in the U.K. in February 1970 (on a double bill with The Night God Screamed (1970)), and finally in the U.S. in a slightly shortened version as Frankenstein's Bloody Terror in 1971. It was released to late-night television (edited) in the U.S. in 1974. The film was shot in Hi-Fi 70mm 3-D, but was only shown that way at a brief engagement in Munich, Germany, and in several select theaters in Hollywood (reviews mentioned the 3D effects looked somewhat shoddy).

The film is available on DVD from Shriek Show as Frankenstein's Bloody Terror, as well as on a German Blu-Ray (Region 2) under the title Die Vampire des Dr. Dracula.

Naschy claimed he followed up this film with a 1968 film Las Noches del Hombre Lobo (which is today a lost film, if indeed it was ever completed at all, since no one has ever seen it) and his 1969 film Los Monstruos del Terror.

Plot
A drunken Gypsy couple spending the night in the abandoned Castle Wolfstein accidentally resurrect the werewolf Imre Wolfstein when they remove the silver cross from his corpse. Once alive, he not only kills the Gypsy couple, but also wreaks havoc on a nearby village. The villagers attribute the attack to ordinary wolves, and in response, form a hunting party to kill off the animals. While on the hunt, Count Waldemar Daninsky is attacked by Imre Wolfstein and is afflicted with lycanthropy. After killing innocent victims in the midst of his transformation, he seeks help from specialists, Dr. Janos de Mikhelov and his wife, who turn out to be two vampires, who then prey on both Janice and Rudolph, Waldemar's friends. The vampires revive the first werewolf, Imre, from the dead, and force the two werewolves to battle each other. Waldemar kills Imre Wolfstein with his fangs and then destroys the two vampires, only to be killed in turn by bullets fired by Janice, the woman who loved him most.

Cast
 Paul Naschy as Count Waldemar Daninsky
 Manuel Manzaneque as Rudolph Weissmann
 Dyanik Zurakowska as Countess Janice Von Aarenberg
 Julian Ugarte as Dr. Janos Mikhelov
 Aurora de Alba as Wandesa
 Rosanna Yanni as Nascha
 Gualberto Gualban as Gyogyo
 Jose Nieto as Count Sigmund Von Aarenberg
 Carlos Casaravilla as Judge Weissmann
 Antonio Orengo as the butler 
 Angel Menendez as Otto The Forest Keeper
 Milagros Ceballos as Magda
 Beatriz Savon as Frau Hildegard
 Victoriano Lopez
 Maria Teresa Torralba
 Angela Rhu
 Pilar Vela
 Juan Medina
 Antonio Jimenez Escribano

Production

Paul Naschy was the stage name of the late Spanish screenwriter and actor Jacinto Molina. The film's German distributors felt that Molina needed a more Teutonic-sounding pseudonym. “Paul” was an homage to the Pope at the time, Paul VI, and “Naschy” was inspired by a well-known Hungarian Olympic athlete, Imre Nagy. La Marca del Hombre Lobo was the first in a long line of werewolf films that would make Paul Naschy world famous.

Naschy wrote an autobiography, which included his first encounter with the werewolf mythology in a movie theater as a young child in 1945. He described the first time he saw the Lon Chaney, Jr. classic, Frankenstein Meets the Wolf Man:

Naschy got the idea to make the first Spanish werewolf film while he was working on Agonizing in Crime in 1967. He broached the idea to the director of that film, Enrique Eguiluz, who initially tried to dissuade him from doing it. Naschy tried to interest Spanish director Amando de Ossorio in the project, who also tried to dissuade him. Finally, Eguiluz reconsidered and helped Naschy to find an interested Spanish film producer.

The film was supposed to be released in Germany as Der Wolfsmensch, but they decided to release it instead as Die Vampire des Dr. Dracula (The Vampires of Dr. Dracula). Later on, the film was re-released in Germany retitled Hexen des Grauens (The Witches of Terror). The film was re-released in Spain in 1976, again with the same title La Marca del Hombre Lobo.In some theaters in the U.S., the film played on a double bill with the Italian horror film The Embalmer.

In the United States, the film was titled Frankenstein's Bloody Terror, solely to satisfy the American distributor's need for a second "Frankenstein film" to pad out a planned double feature release. To justify this odd choice of title, an animated opening sequence especially created for the film explained that a branch of the Frankenstein family became cursed with lycanthropy and took the name Wolfstein. American producer Sam Sherman needed to fill 400 play dates for his film Dracula vs. Frankenstein which, at that time, was entangled in a legal stand-off with an unscrupulous film lab contracted to produce the release prints. The 400 theaters in question had been promised a Frankenstein double feature and Sherman was determined to give them one. Both films thus ran together in 1971 and after only in American theaters.

La Marca del Hombre Lobo was filmed in Jan Jacobsen’s Hi-Fi Stereo 70 3-D format. When Sherman learned this, he was persuaded by other investors to hire optical effects maestro Linwood Dunn to create single-strip, over-and-under 35mm prints for American release. The final results were reportedly beautiful to look at when projected through high-quality 3-D lenses (such as those created by Robert V. Bernier for Space-Vision), but a celebrity-studded Hollywood premiere was completely undone when Sherman’s fellow investors provided shoddy acrylic lenses for the projectors; hence from then on, it was only shown in Germany in 70mm 3-D.

Reception
The film grossed enough to cover its $300,000 cost in Spain and earned $700,000 overseas.

Alternate Titles
 La Marca del Hombre Lobo (Spain/Mexico)
 Die Vampire des Dr. Dracula (Germany)
 Hexen des Grauens (German re-release title)
 Hell's Creatures (U.K./ Australia)
 Frankenstein's Bloody Terror (U.S.)
 Le Notti di Satana (Italy)
 Les Fantomes de Dracula en de Weerwolf (Belgium)
 Hell Creature (Pakistan)

References

External links

1960s Spanish-language films
Spanish vampire films
1960s 3D films
Spanish werewolf films
1968 horror films
1968 films
Spanish supernatural horror films
1960s exploitation films
Waldemar Daninsky series